The 1951 Pepperdine Waves football team represented George Pepperdine College as a member of the California Collegiate Athletic Association (CCAA) during the 1951 college football season. The team was led by first-year head coach Duck Dowell and played home games at El Camino Stadium on the campus of El Camino College in Torrance, California. They finished the season with an overall record of 5–4–1 and a mark of 2–1–1 in conference play, tying for second in the CCAA.

Schedule

Team players in the NFL
The following Pepperdine players were selected in the 1952 NFL Draft.

Notes

References

Pepperdine
Pepperdine Waves football seasons
Pepperdine Waves football